Clarence Clemens Clendenen (June 8, 1899 – November 19, 1977) was an American historian. He won the 1960 Beveridge Award from the American Historical Association for The United States and Pancho Villa.

Biography
Clarence C. Clendenen was born in Colorado Springs, Colorado on June 8, 1899.

He graduated from the United States Military Academy in 1920.

He died in Alhambra, California on November 19, 1977, and was buried at Golden Gate National Cemetery.

References

1899 births
1977 deaths
Writers from Colorado Springs, Colorado
United States Military Academy alumni
Michigan State University alumni
Stanford University alumni
United States Military Academy faculty
Michigan State University faculty
Hoover Institution people
20th-century American historians
20th-century American male writers
American male non-fiction writers
Burials at Golden Gate National Cemetery